Ercheia umbrosa is a species of moth of the family Erebidae. It is found in Japan, Korea, China and India.

The larvae feed on Albizzia julibrissin.

References

External links
Species info

Insects of Korea
Moths of Asia
Moths of Japan
Moths described in 1881
Ercheiini